The city of Vilnius as of early 2021 had a population between 569,729 (according to Statistics Lithuania), 588,412 (according to the State Enterprise Centre of Registers). According to the municipality of Vilnius, the city had a population of 597,610 as of May 2022 – the figure includes Grigiškės, a separate town within the municipality of the capital. The actual number of city inhabitants could be higher as according to the Vilnius territorial health insurance fund, there were 732,815 permanent inhabitants as of January 2021 in Vilnius city and Vilnius district municipalities combined. According to the predictions, made by the municipality specialists of the city planning department of Vilnius, the number of inhabitants of Vilnius in 2030 could be between 630,3 thousand (pessimistic scenario) and 685 thousand (optimistic scenario) with the basic scenario of 651,6 thousand inhabitants within the city borders.

After the Russian invasion of Ukraine and an influx of Ukrainian refugees to Lithuania, who were granted a refugee status the number of inhabitants of Vilnius rose to 630,885 as of March 2023 (according to the municipality of Vilnius). The number of inhabitants of Vilnius, born in Ukraine rose from 10 thousand to 29 thousand between 2021 and 2023. The number of persons born in Belarus rose from 25 thousand to 37 thousand during the same period mostly as a consequence of 2020–2021 Belarusian protests and intensified fleeing abroad of its citizens. Also, numbers of persons, who settle in Vilnius, coming from Central Asia, Caucasus, African, Asian (most notably - India) countries are on the rise.

Evolution
Demographic evolution of Vilnius between 1766 and 2023:

Vilnius inhabitants by ethnicity

Vilnius inhabitants by the country of birth

Elderships of Vilnius

Notes

References

Works cited
 
 
 

Geography of Vilnius
History of Vilnius
Demographics of Lithuania
Vilnius